Chandrashekhar Basavaraj Patil is a member of the Karnataka Legislative Council who belongs to the Indian National Congress. He won the Karnataka Legislative council seat by 321 votes against K.B. Srinivas of BJP in 2018.

References 

Living people
Members of the Karnataka Legislative Council
Indian National Congress politicians from Karnataka
1970 births